"Soaked" is a song by New Zealand musician Benee. It was released as a single on 14 September 2018 as the lead single from Benee's debut extended play Fire on Marzz. The song was released on Spotify, received airplay on New Zealand radio, and reached number 58 on the Triple J Hottest 100, 2018.

Background 
In a press release, the song was described as "indie-slack fun with a little R'n'B swing". In 2019, Benee re-recorded the song in Te Reo Māori for Waiata / Anthems, a collection of re-recorded New Zealand pop songs to promote te Wiki o te Reo Māori (Māori Language Week). The new version, retitled "Kua Kore He Kupu / Soaked", featured lyrics reinterpreted by scholar Tīmoti Kāretu. This version reached number five on the New Zealand artists' singles chart.

Critical reception 
"Soaked" was called a "slick, funk-fuelled pop number" by Pilerats, while The Music Network described it as "an R'n'B drenched slice of alt-pop that accentuates the young singer's soulful vocals".

Charts

Weekly charts

Year-end charts

Certifications

References 

2018 singles
2018 songs
Benee songs
Republic Records singles
Songs written by Benee
Songs written by Josh Fountain
Songs written by Djeisan Suskov
Torch songs
Song recordings produced by Josh Fountain